Wiseman is a surname. Notable people with the surname include:

 Adele Wiseman, Canadian author
 Bob Wiseman, Canadian musician, filmmaker, singer-songwriter, actor 
 Chad Wiseman, Canadian ice hockey player
 Clarence Wiseman, 10th General of the Salvation Army
 Danny Wiseman, American professional bowler
 Debbie Wiseman, English film and television composer
 Donald Wiseman, English professor, archeologist and writer
 Douglas Wiseman, Canadian politician
 Ernest Wiseman, English comedian, stage name Ernie Wise
 Frederick Wiseman, American film director
 Gary Wiseman, American musician for the rock band Bowling for Soup
 Gregory R. Wiseman, NASA astronaut
 Howard M. Wiseman, Australian theoretical quantum physicist 
 James Wiseman (born 2001), American basketball player
 Jay Wiseman, BDSM author
 Jennifer Wiseman, American astronomer
 Jim Wiseman, Canadian politician 
 John Wiseman, former SAS soldier, 1980s
 Johnny Wiseman former SAS soldier, Second World War
 Joseph Wiseman (1918–2009), Canadian actor
 Len Wiseman, American film director and screenwriter
 Lofty Wiseman, British author and survival consultant
 Loren Wiseman, American game designer
 Mac Wiseman, American bluegrass singer
 Margaret Wiseman, Scottish female curler
 Mary Wiseman (born 1961), American lawyer and judge
 Mary Wiseman, American actress
 Nicholas Wiseman, Cardinal Archbishop of Westminster
 Neil Wiseman, British computer scientist
 Paul Wiseman, New Zealand cricketer 
 Paula Wiseman, children's book publisher and founder of Paula Wiseman Books
Rhett Wiseman (born 1994), American baseball player
 Richard Wiseman (1622–1676), English surgeon 
 Richard Wiseman, English psychology professor
 Robert Wiseman, Scottish businessman
 Rochelle Wiseman (born 1989), British singer
 Rosalind Wiseman, American educator and author
 Scott Wiseman, English footballer
 Solomon Wiseman, Australian convict, merchant and shipowner
 Thomas A. Wiseman Jr., U.S. federal judge
 Tina Wiseman, American actress
 T. P. Wiseman, Classical scholar, University of Exeter, England, UK
 William Wiseman (disambiguation), multiple people

Fictional characters 
 Bernard Wiseman, a character from the OVA series Mobile Suit Gundam 0080: War in the Pocket

See also
Weissmann, surname